The Eskdalemuir Observatory is a UK national environmental observatory located near Eskdalemuir, Dumfries and Galloway, Scotland.

Built in 1904, its remote location was chosen to minimise electrical interference with geomagnetic instruments, which were relocated here from Kew Observatory in London in 1908 after the spread of electric tramcars led to excessive electromagnetic interference there.

The distinguished meteorologist and mathematician Lewis Fry Richardson served as Superintendent at the Observatory between 1913 and 1918.

Purpose
The observatory is situated in the valley of the White Esk river at an altitude of 242m, and so represents the climate of highland in northern Great Britain.

It currently monitors:

Meteorological parameters
Solar radiation
Atmospheric pollution
The UK Geomagnetic field
Seismological activity

The observatory is managed by the British Geological Survey and the UK Met Office.

Seismic measurements

The area has a low background of seismic activity, so is ideal for these measurements.

The event registered 1.6 on the Richter magnitude scale.

There is a second seismic array approximately 3 km north of the main observatory established by the United Kingdom Atomic Energy Authority, which has been managed by Güralp Systems Ltd since 2002 on behalf of AWE Blacknest which provides the UK part of the international monitoring network of the Comprehensive Test Ban Treaty. This network allows covert nuclear tests to be detected via their seismic signatures. At Eskdalemuir it consists of an array covering 10 square km, consisting of two intersecting lines of 10 pits containing seismometers, a seismological vault and a recording laboratory.

Notable staff

Dr Arthur Crichton Mitchell superintendent of the observatory 1916 to 1922
Dr Douglas Haig McIntosh worked here 1953 to 1955.

References

External links
Eskdalemuir Observatory operations - BGS website

Buildings and structures completed in 1904
Geophysical observatories
Meteorological observatories
Seismological observatories, organisations and projects
Pan Am Flight 103
Category B listed buildings in Dumfries and Galloway